Abdullah Hussein al-Dafa'i (1959–30 October 2015) was a Yemeni politician. He was previously Minister of Housing and Urban Planning from 1998 to 2001 and then as Minister of Public Works and Highways from 2001 to 2006. He served as the ambassador of Yemen to United Arab Emirates from 20 September 2007 to 19 May 2013.

Education 
Al-Dafa'i was born in 1959 in Sana'a governorate. He studied civil engineering in United States.

References 

1959 births
20th-century Yemeni politicians

Public works ministers of Yemen
21st-century Yemeni politicians
People from Sanaa Governorate
2015 deaths
Ambassadors of Yemen to the United Arab Emirates
21st-century Yemeni diplomats